Qalam Ab (also Romanized as Qalam Āb; also known as Kolanī-ye Qalam Āb) is a village in Mazu Rural District, Alvar-e Garmsiri District, Andimeshk County, Khuzestan Province, Iran. At the 2006 census, its population was 55, in 12 families.

References 

Populated places in Andimeshk County